Last Word is an obituary BBC radio series broadcast weekly on Radio 4. Each week the lives of several famous people who have recently died are summarised with narration, and interviews with people who knew them. The programme is normally presented by 
Matthew Bannister, although on odd occasions it has been presented by other people such as Kate Silverton or Julian Worricker.  

The programme was first broadcast on 10 February 2006, with a biography of American songwriter Paul Vance (1929–2022) being broadcast on the edition of 29 September 2006, a rare example of somebody still living being featured as a Last Word subject, with Vance also being interview by the programme, after his death was announced in the media by mistake.

References

BBC Last Word website page

BBC Radio 4 programmes